Halomonas alkaliphila is a Gram-negative halophilic Pseudomonadota. Its specific epithet stems from the Arabic word alkali (al-qaliy), the ashes of saltwort and the Latin adjective philus -a -um, meaning "friend" or "loving": loving alkaline media.

References

External links
Type strain of Halomonas alkaliphila at BacDive -  the Bacterial Diversity Metadatabase

Oceanospirillales
Bacteria described in 2007